was a Japanese singer and television celebrity most famous for singing the Japanese version of the Village People's hit song "Y.M.C.A.," called "Young Man." In the 1970s, he was called  with Goro Noguchi and Hiromi Go. Although the original version was camp, Saijō's version was intended to seriously inspire "young men."

Career
Saijō's career spanned over three decades. He gained popularity again in the 1990s in the anime Chibi Maruko-chan and by releasing a cover version of the Enrique Iglesias song "Bailamos." He also sang the theme song and became the character (specially created for the Japanese version — Lucky Mucho) in The Emperor's New Groove and also performed "Turn a Turn," the first opening theme song for ∀ Gundam.

In the late 1990s, he also appeared on an episode of the original Japanese cooking show Iron Chef as a guest judge, for the Rice Battle, involving Iron Chef Japanese Masaharu Morimoto and Chinese chef Masayoshi Kimura.

In 2003, around the time that his 85th single was to be released, he suffered a mild stroke while performing overseas in Korea. After rehabilitation, in 2006, he released his 86th single, "Meguriai." Lyrics were set to André Gagnon's "Comme au Premier Jour."

In 2009, he released a downloadable single, "Vegetable Wonderful" which is tied to the NHK program, Time for Vegetables.

Personal life and death 
Saijo married Miki Makihara in 2001, and they had one daughter and two sons.

In June 2003, while promoting his new released song in South Korea, Saijo suffered a stroke which resulted in his speech being partially impaired. After several years of rehabilitation, Saijo was on his way toward full recovery until his cerebral infarction relapsed in 2011, resulting in his right side being paralyzed.  In spite of his failing health, Saijo courageously continued to perform to please his fans.

Saijo died from acute heart failure in a hospital in Yokohama city on May 16, 2018.

Discography 
 Koi suru kisetsu (1972)
 Koi no yakusoku (1972)
 Chance wa ichido (1972)
 Seishun ni kakeyo (1972)
 Jonetsu no arashi (1973)
 Chigireta ai (1973)
 Ai no jujika (1973)
 Bara no kusari (1974)
 Hageshii koi (1974)
 Kizudarake no Lola (1974)
 Kono ai no tokimeki (1975)
 Koi no boso (1975)
 Shiroi kyokai (1975)
 Kimiyo dakarete atsuku nare (1976)
 Jaguar (1976)
 Wakaki shishitachi (1976)
 Last scene (1976)
 Boomerang street (1977)
 Sexy rock’n roller (1977)
 Botan wo hazuse (1977)
 Boots wo nuide choshoku wo (1978)
 Anata to ai no tameni (1978)
 Honoo (1978)
 Blue sky blue (1978)
 Haruka naru koibito e (1978)
 YOUNG MAN (Y.M.C.A.) (1979)
 Hop step jump (1979)
 Yuki ga areba (1979)
 Ai no sono (1980)
 Oretachi no jidai (1980)
 Nemurenu yoru (1980)
 Santa maria no inori (1980)
 Little girl (1981)
 Sexy girl (1981)
 Sentimental girl (1981)
 Gypsy (1981)
 Minami jujisei (1982)
 Seishojo (1982)
 Hyoryusha tachi (1982)
 Gyarando (1983)
 Night game (1983)
 Do you know (1984)
 Dakishimete jiruba (1984)
 Ichimankonen no ai (1985)
 Ude no nakae (1985)
 Tsuioku no hitomi (1986)
 Rain of dream (1986)
 Yakusoku no tabi (1986)
 New York girl (1987)
 Blue sky (1988)
 Hashire Shojikimono (1991)
 Rock Your Fire (1991)
 Sayyea Jan-go (1994)
 Tasogareyo sobani ite (1995)
 Round'n'round (1996)
 Parasite Love (1996)
 Moment (1997)
 2R kara hajimeyo (1998)
 Saigo no ai (1999)
 Turn A Turn (opening theme for ∀ Gundam Episodes 2~28) (1999)
 Bailamos ~ Tonight we dance (1999)
 Love torture (2000)
 Toki no kizahashi (2000)
 Jasmine (2001)
 Everybody dance (2002)
 Sodai gomi Ja ne (2003)
 Meguriai (2006)
 "Vegetable wonderful" (2009)
 "Shinkiro" (2015)

Awards
 1973, 15th Japan Record Awards, Vocal Award
 1974, 16th Japan Record Awards, Vocal Award
 1976, 18th Japan Record Awards, Vocal Award
 1978, 20th Japan Record Awards, Gold Award
 1979, 21st Japan Record Awards, Gold Award
 1980, 22nd Japan Record Awards, Gold Award
 1981, 23rd Japan Record Awards, Gold Award
 1982, 24th Japan Record Awards, Gold Award
 1983, 25th Japan Record Awards, Gold Award
 2018, 60th Japan Record Awards, Special Achievement Award

References

External links 
  
 Hideko Saijo at Oricon 

1955 births
2018 deaths
Musicians from Hiroshima
Japanese baritones
People of Shōwa-period Japan
20th-century Japanese male singers
20th-century Japanese singers
21st-century Japanese male singers
21st-century Japanese singers
Deaths from congestive heart failure